Kyle Benjamin Gibson (born October 23, 1987) is an American professional baseball pitcher for the Baltimore Orioles of Major League Baseball (MLB). He has previously played in MLB for the Minnesota Twins, Texas Rangers and Philadelphia Phillies. The Twins selected Gibson in the first round, 22nd overall, of the 2009 MLB Draft, and made his MLB debut in 2013.

Early life 
Gibson was born in Greenfield, Indiana, to Harold and Sharon Gibson. He has a sister named Holly.

Between his freshman and sophomore year of high school, Gibson transferred from Cathedral High School in Indianapolis to Greenfield-Central High School; as a result, the Indiana High School Athletic Association (IHSAA) ruled that he could not play for Greenfield-Central's high school baseball team for one season.

During his junior year, he was 7–2 and led the Cougars to a sectional championship and to the regional finals.  In his senior year, he was 8–6 with a 0.98 ERA and 140 strikeouts.  He led Greenfield to the Elite Eight by pitching all of his team's tournament games.  He was named the Hancock County Player of the Year after his senior year.  He was also named to the Indianapolis Star All-East team in both his junior and senior years. After his senior year, he was named All-East Player of the Year and made the Indiana All-Star Team.

College career 
The Philadelphia Phillies of Major League Baseball (MLB) selected Gibson in the 36th round of the 2006 MLB Draft, but he chose not to sign. Instead, he opted to play college baseball for the Missouri Tigers, serving as the No. 2 starter behind Aaron Crow. In 2007, he played collegiate summer baseball with the Falmouth Commodores of the Cape Cod Baseball League and was named a league all-star.

Professional career

Minor league career 
Despite worries that a stress fracture to his elbow would negatively impact his chances in the 2009 MLB Draft, the Minnesota Twins selected Gibson in the first round, 22nd overall after receiving the all-clear from the team's doctor. Negotiations for Gibson's signing bonus forced his decision to sign with the team into the final hour before the August 16 deadline, with Gibson ultimately agreeing to sign with the team for a bonus of $1.85 million. The stress fracture pushed Gibson's professional baseball debut back to the beginning of the 2010 season, when he was assigned to the Class A-Advanced Fort Myers Miracle of the Florida State League. In seven starts with Fort Myers, Gibson posted a 4–1 record and a 1.87 ERA, striking out 40 batters in  innings of work.

Gibson's stint with the Miracle was short-lived: on May 11, he was promoted to the Double-A New Britain Rock Cats in order to clear room on the Fort Myers 25-man roster for new pitchers Loek van Mil and Andrei Lobanov. After winning his first three Double-A starts and building a strikeout-to-walk ratio of 3.17 in his first month and a half with his new team, Gibson was one of three Rock Cats players selected to appear at the 2010 Eastern League All-Star Game that July. Gibson put up a 7–5 record at New Britain, with a 3.68 ERA in 16 starts and 77 strikeouts in 93 innings, before he received another promotion to the Triple-A Rochester Red Wings on August 11. He had been called up to replace Jeff Manship, who had been promoted to the major leagues as a fill-in for the injured Jose Mijares. Twins minor league director Jim Rantz informed reporters that there was no intention of promoting Gibson beyond Rochester during the 2010 season, as the team wanted to shut him down after 150–160 innings, and he had already pitched  between Fort Myers and New Britain. He was shut down on August 25 in order to preserve his forearm for future seasons. At the time, Gibson had gone 0–0 with a 1.72 ERA in three Triple-A starts, giving him a combined 11–6 record and 2.96 ERA for the year. He had pitched a total of 152 innings, with 126 strikeouts and 39 walks, and had been placed on the disabled list with a sprained ankle.

Going into the 2011 season as Baseball Americas top-ranked prospect with in the Twins organization, Gibson received an invitation to spring training. He was assigned to Rochester for the season, where he seemed to experience a sophomore slump: Gibson did not win a game for the Red Wings after May 29, and was 3–8 with a 4.81 ERA when he was placed on the disabled list at the start of August with an elbow injury. After a non-surgical rehabilitation program did not improve his health, Gibson underwent Tommy John surgery to repair his ulnar collateral ligament. He returned to the mound in 2012, pitching a series of rehab assignments for the Twins' lower-level affiliates before returning to Rochester on August 22, 2012, for the final two weeks of the International League season. In two starts at the end of the season, Gibson went 0–2 with a 9.45 ERA, striking out 10 batters in  innings. He continued his rehabilitation process in the Arizona Fall League, where he finished 3–2 with a 5.40 ERA, striking out 28 batters and allowing 31 hits in  innings. Gibson opened the 2013 season in Rochester, with Twins management anticipating that he would make his MLB debut sometime that season.

Minnesota Twins 
The Twins called Gibson up to the major leagues on June 25, 2013, after starting pitcher Mike Pelfrey suffered a back injury that placed him on the disabled list. At the time, he was the ninth pitcher to start a game for Minnesota during the 2013 MLB season, and his promotion offered a path to remain in the majors for the remainder of the year. Gibson was credited with the win in his MLB debut, allowing two runs and eight hits while striking out five batters in six innings on June 29. The Twins defeated the Kansas City Royals 6–2. His success did not continue past that debut, as Gibson struggled to strike out batters in his future starts. After posting a 2–4 record and a 6.53 ERA with 29 strikeouts in 10 starts and 51 innings, Gibson was optioned back to Rochester on August 19. In his final major league start of the season, he gave up four runs on 10 hits in only  innings. While he was sent back to Triple A to work on his pitch command, Twins manager Ron Gardenhire took the time to analyze how many innings Gibson had already pitched and to develop a plan for the remainder of the season. He was shut down for the season on September 2, after pitching a combined  innings between Rochester and Minnesota, with the expectation that he would compete for a Twins starting rotation position the following spring.

The Twins spent the 2013–14 offseason retooling their pitching rotation, spending approximately $84 million on signing new pitchers during the free agency period and giving Gibson an upwards battle for a major league position on opening day. He proceeded to outbattle Scott Diamond, Vance Worley, and Samuel Deduno during spring training, posting a 2.70 ERA in four starts. Gibson was named the No. 5 starter, while Deduno was sent to the bullpen and Worley was sent to Rochester. He emerged as an early ace, posting an ERA of only 0.93 after his first three starts, including a scoreless eight-inning performance against the Toronto Blue Jays in  weather. He did not allow a home run in a game until May 10, when he gave up a three-run home run to Miguel Cabrera of the Detroit Tigers; Gibson lasted only two innings in that game, giving up six runs in the process. Gibson recorded his first MLB hit as a batter on June 2, a fifth-inning single against Matt Garza in a 6–2 loss to the Milwaukee Brewers. Gibson remained in the rotation for the season, finishing with a 13–12 record and a 4.47 ERA in 31 starts. He additionally struck out 107 batters in  innings.

He led the team in innings, in wins and bettered his ERA from 4.47 to 3.84 in 2015.

Gibson opened the 2016 season as the Twins' No. 2 starter, behind ace Ervin Santana. Both pitchers were placed on the 15-day disabled list on April 26, Santana with a lower back strain and Gibson with a right shoulder strain. He was meant to return on June 2, but began to experience back pain during his rehab assignment and had to be scratched from his scheduled start. Gibson was reinstated to the active roster on June 10, and he picked up his first win of the season on June 28, pitching seven innings of the Twins' 4–0 shutout against the Chicago White Sox. After struggling with stamina in a stretch of seven starts, Gibson pitched his first complete game victory on August 17, giving up only three runs on eight hits in a 10–3 victory over the Atlanta Braves. Because the Twins were playing a National League team at their home, Gibson also needed to bat in the game, and he became the first Minnesota pitcher to make five plate appearances in a game since Johan Santana in 2007. He went 6–11 for the year, with a 5.07 ERA and 104 strikeouts in 25 starts and  innings.

After a difficult start to the 2017 season, going 0–4 with an 8.20 ERA in his first six starts, Gibson was optioned to Rochester on May 4. Gibson understood why he was sent down, telling reporters, "I don't know that I've had a more frustrating stretch that I can even remember" during his baseball career. His minor-league stint was short-lived, as an injury to Phil Hughes forced the Twins to call Gibson back up on May 22. He continued to struggle in Minnesota, and when the Twins received former Braves pitcher Jaime Garcia at the trading deadline, Gibson was optioned to Rochester for a second time to make room for Garcia in the rotation. Twins manager Paul Molitor said that the decision to send Gibson to Triple-A would keep him available should there be an issue in the Twins' rotation; if he had been sent to the bullpen, he could not be asked to make a start as easily.

He compiled the same ERA in 2017, but with 12 wins, and hitters again hit over .290 against him. In 2018, he entered the Twins’ rotation again and started achieving a career-high strikeout rate than before — as of June 2018, he had struck out 66 batters in just 63 innings. Gibson finished the season with a record of 10–13 in  innings. He led the team in ERA, finishing with a 3.62 ERA and a career high 179 strikeouts. He slotted 2nd in the Twins rotation in 2019. Gibson's K/9 rose to a career high 9 despite registering an ERA of 4.84 in 160 innings. Gibson tied a career high in wins with 13.

Texas Rangers
A free agent after the 2019 season, Gibson signed a three-year, $28 million contract with the Texas Rangers on December 6, 2019. Because of his ulcerative colitis diagnosis, Gibson was considered "high risk" for COVID-19, and was given the option to opt out of the 2020 MLB season while receiving a full pro-rated salary. After discussion with his wife and gastroenterologist, he decided to play the season and limit his non-baseball outings. The 60-game season was ultimately the worst of Gibson's career as he went 2–6 with a 5.35 ERA, a 1.53 WHIP, and a 5.39 fielding independent pitching (FIP). After picking up his first win of the season on August 15, Gibson did not win again until he pitched a complete game shutout against the Houston Astros on September 17. Prior to the shutout, the Rangers staff had isolated a mechanical issue when Gibson was pitching from the stretch, which he responded to by narrowing his stance. Gibson and the rest of the Rangers' starting rotation remained healthy throughout the shortened season, but saw low inning counts: Gibson was second on the team with  innings pitched, while his rotation mate Lance Lynn led MLB with 84.

His opening day outing proved to be a fluke, as Gibson's ERA over his next five starts was only 0.82, and he did not allow a single home run in the month of April. After leading the AL with a 1.98 ERA and a 6–0 record through his first 16 starts, Gibson received his first All-Star Game selection in 2021, joining his Rangers teammates Joey Gallo and Adolis Garcia.

Philadelphia Phillies
On July 30, 2021, Gibson was traded to the Philadelphia Phillies along with Ian Kennedy, Hans Crouse, and cash considerations in exchange for Spencer Howard, Kevin Gowdy, and Josh Gessner. He recorded his 1,000th career strikeout in his Phillies debut on August 1, fanning Michael Pérez of the Pittsburgh Pirates in the fifth inning of a 15–4 Phillies rout.

In 2022 he was 10-8 with a 5.05 ERA in 167.2 innings over 31 starts. He gave up 24 home runs, 10th-most in the NL.

Baltimore Orioles
On December 5, 2022, Gibson signed a one-year contract with the Baltimore Orioles.

Pitcher profile 
Gibson carries a six-pitch repertoire consisting of a sinking fastball, a slider, a cut fastball, a four-seam fastball, a changeup, and a curveball. Boasting a fastball speed of only , rather than pitching for power, he aims to confuse his opponents by getting them to chase balls outside of the strike zone. His  changeup breaks to the opposite side of the former two pitches, while the  curveball serves as a surprise from the other five. This expanded repertoire has made Gibson an unpredictable pitcher to face; whereas, early in his career, batters knew how to hit well against him, he has improved at generating strikeouts, particularly with use of his slider.

Personal life
Gibson married Elizabeth Straatmann on November 27, 2010. The couple have three children together, with the youngest born in September 2019. Gibson identifies as a Christian, and grew up attending a Southern Baptist church in Indiana.

References

External links

Missouri Tigers bio

1987 births
Living people
American League All-Stars
Baseball players from Indiana
Falmouth Commodores players
Fort Myers Miracle players
Gulf Coast Twins players
Major League Baseball pitchers
Minnesota Twins players
Missouri Tigers baseball players
New Britain Rock Cats players
People from Greenfield, Indiana
Peoria Javelinas players
Philadelphia Phillies players
Rochester Red Wings players
Texas Rangers players
Christians from Indiana